Eve Watkinson (6 March 1909 – 15 November 1999) was an Irish stage, film and television actress.

Biography
Eve Panton Watkinson was born 6 March 1909 in Terenure to Arthur Panton Watkinson and Kate née Hollingsworth. Her father was the director of an interior decorating company called A. Panton Watkinson on St Stephen's Green. She learned acting working with an amateur group in Capel Street called Torch Theatre. She went on to work with Edward and Christine Longford's company based in the Gate Theatre. Watkinson performed in leading roles in plays by Ibsen, Sheridan, Coleman, Shakespeare and Fry. She played the Vampire Monster Mallarka in Carmilla and gained that became her nickname with the company. Left an inheritance enough to live on, Watkinson used the money she earned in acting to produce productions of her own.

Watkinson also spent several years with the Bristol Old Vic Theatre company. When Raidió Teilifís Éireann began to produce television plays, she had several roles including in plays by Dürrenmatt, Christopher Nolan and Frank O'Connor. She went with Torchlight and Laser Beams to the Edinburgh Festival. She also worked as a presenter for RTE Radio. In the 1960s Watkinson narrated stories for children.  Watkinson had a role in the 1988 Irish film Reefer and the Model. Watkinson died in Monkstown 15 November 1999.

Excerpt Playography
 Hedda Gabler
 Rosmersholm
 The Lady from the Sea
 The Dark is Light Enough
 The School for Scandal
 The Jealous Wife
 The Physicists
 The Moment next to nothing
 Torchlight and Laser Beams
 The Moses Rock

References

1909 births
1999 deaths
Actresses from Dublin (city)
20th-century Irish actresses
Irish stage actresses
Irish film actresses
Irish television actresses